Riki is a given name. It is a gender-neutral name in Japan (written:  or ). Notable people with the name include:

Riki (footballer, born 1980), Spanish footballer Iván Sánchez-Rico Soto
Riki (footballer, born 1997), Spanish footballer Ricardo Rodríguez Gil Carcedo
Riki Blich (born 1979), Israeli actress
Riki Cakić (born 1990), Bosnian-born Swedish footballer
, ring name of Mitsuo Yoshida, Korean-Japanese professional wrestler
Riki Christodoulou (born 1988), British racing driver
Riki Cowan (born 1963), New Zealand rugby union player
Riki Ellison (born 1960), New Zealand player of American football
Riki Flutey (born 1980), New Zealand-born English rugby union player
, Japanese mixed martial artist
Riki Gal (born 1950), Israeli singer
Riki Guy (born c. 1975), Israeli opera singer
, Japanese footballer
Riki Hoeata (born 1988), New Zealand rugby union player
, Japanese politician
, Japanese footballer
Riki Kobayashi (1924–2013), American chemical engineer
Riki Kumeta (born 1983), Japanese karateka
Riki LeCotey, Canadian cosplayer, model and costume designer
Riki Lindhome (born 1979), American actress, comedian and musician
Riki Maiocchi (1940–2004), Italian singer and musician
Riki (Riccardo Marcuzzo, born 1992), Italian singer
, Japanese footballer
Riki Michele, American singer
, Japanese actor
, Japanese judoka
Riki Ott (born 1954), American marine toxicologist and activist
Riki Papakura, New Zealand rugby union player
Riki R. Nelson, American painter
Riki Rachtman (born 1965), American television and radio personality
Riki Sorsa (1952–2016), Finnish singer
, Japanese footballer
, Japanese actor
Riki Turofsky (born 1944), Canadian opera singer, broadcaster and video producer
Riki van Steeden (born 1976), New Zealand soccer player
Riki Wessels (born 1985), Australian cricketer
Riki Wilchins (born 1952), American activist

Fictional characters
, protagonist of the visual novel Little Busters!
 Riki, a Nopon and playable character in Xenoblade Chronicles

See also
Rikki
Ricky (given name)

Hypocorisms
Japanese masculine given names